The 1876 Wellington City mayoral election was part of the New Zealand local elections held that same year. William Hutchison, the incumbent Mayor sought re-election and retained office unopposed with no other candidates emerging.

Background
In his term as Mayor of Wellington, Hutchinson was mostly occupied with the issue of whether the Wellington Waterfront should be controlled by the city council directly or by a separate entity. It would later result in the creation of the Wellington Harbour Board. It was the first of four instances between 1876 and 1898 where the mayoralty was uncontested.

Notes

References

Mayoral elections in Wellington
1876 elections in New Zealand
Politics of the Wellington Region
1870s in Wellington
December 1876 events